Vignesh Shivan, credited sometimes as Vignesh Shivn (born 18 September 1985) is an Indian film director, film producer, actor, singer and lyricist who works in Tamil cinema, making films of many genres.

Personal life
Shivan Studied in Santhome Higher Secondary School, Mylapore, Chennai. Shivan and actress Nayanthara had been in a relationship ever since they worked together on Naanum Rowdy Dhaan in 2015. They announced their engagement in 2021, and got married on 9 June 2022 at Sheraton Grand in Mahabalipuram.The couple had twin boys on 9 October 2022.

Career
After getting Dharan to compose music for it, showed the film to producers, Gemini Film Circuit, and then to Silambarasan and both parties agreed to collaborate to make it a feature film titled Podaa Podi (2012). The joint producers of the film, Shanaya Telefilms, released a series of posters in June 2008 publicising the film, while Silambarasan and Vignesh toured in Canada scouting for locations and agreeing a deal with Mayor Ron Stevens to film in Orillia and Toronto. The film languished in production for close to four years, before finally releasing in October 2012 to mixed reviews. He then continued to be active in films by working as a lyricist, filming independent music videos and appeared in a cameo role as an engineer in Velaiyilla Pattathari (2014) along with Dhanush.

His second film, Naanum Rowdy Dhaan (2015), went through several changes of cast and production studios, before finalising on Vijay Sethupathi and Nayanthara as lead actors and Dhanush as producer.

In his third venture, Thaanaa Serndha Koottam, he teamed up with Suriya and Keerthy Suresh. Anirudh Ravichander wrote the music numbers.

Vignesh Shivan along with Nayanthara, founded a new venture called Rowdy Pictures which produced the films Pebbles (2021) and Rocky (2021).

Filmography

As director, writer and actor

As producer
 Netrikann (2021)
Koozhangal (2021)
Kaathuvaakula Rendu Kaadhal (2022)
Rocky (2021)
Connect (2022)

As distributor
Rocky (2021)

As lyricist

Other work

Music videos

References

External links
 

Living people
Tamil film directors
Tamil film poets
Tamil-language lyricists
1985 births
Indian Tamil people
21st-century Indian film directors